Struthanthus is a genus of flowering plants in the family Loranthaceae.

Species include:
Struthanthus acostensis
Struthanthus acuminatus
Struthanthus aequatoris
Struthanthus andersonii
Struthanthus andrastylus
Struthanthus angustifolius
Struthanthus armandianus
Struthanthus attenuatus
Struthanthus calobotrys
Struthanthus calophyllus
Struthanthus cansjerifolius
Struthanthus capitatus
Struthanthus cassythoides
Struthanthus confertus
Struthanthus corymbifer
Struthanthus costaricensis
Struthanthus crassipes
Struthanthus cuspidatus
Struthanthus deppeanus
Struthanthus dorothyae
Struthanthus eichleri
Struthanthus eichlerianus
Struthanthus elegans
 Struthanthus lojae
Struthanthus rubens
Struthanthus rufofurfuraceus
Struthanthus rufus
Struthanthus salicifolius
Struthanthus salzmanni
Struthanthus santaremensis
Struthanthus sarmentosus
Struthanthus subtilis
Struthanthus syringifolius
Struthanthus tacanensis
Struthanthus taubatensis
Struthanthus tenuifolius
Struthanthus tenuis
Struthanthus terniflorus

References

Loranthaceae
Loranthaceae genera
Taxonomy articles created by Polbot